The Damage Done is an EP released by Gumball in 1993.

Track listing
"The Damage Done" Article text.
"Thunder (Alt. Version)"
"Chew The Chew"
"Straight Line"
"Upsetters" (Live on VPRO National Radio Hilversum, Holland 5/11/93)
"Accelerator" (Re-Mixed by Thurston Moore)

Music Video listing
"The Damage Done"
"Accelerator"

References 

1993 EPs
Gumball (band) albums